Birla Institute of Technology (BIT)  is an Engineering and Technology College in the state of West Bengal and Is located in Kolkata, near the university of Rabindra Bharati and the Calcutta University Department of Economics.BIT has a vision of creating future engineers with skill and expertise to meet up to the expectations of future generation to come, the institute is equipped with state of the art science and technology labs with modern equipment's for the help of its students.  The college is affiliated to WBSCTE and AICTE, 
approved by UGC  The college offers Engineering Courses in Electrical, Electronics & Instrumentation, Mechanical, Electronics & tele-Communication engineering, and Packaging technology & Science(Chemical Engineering) .

References

External links
 

Universities and colleges in Kolkata
Educational institutions established in 1958
1958 establishments in West Bengal
Engineering colleges in West Bengal